The Ministry of Human and Minority Rights and Social Dialogue of the Republic of Serbia is the ministry in the Government of Serbia which is in charge of human and minority rights. The ministry merged into the Ministry of Public Administration and Local Self-Government on 14 March 2011 and was re-instated again under the Second cabinet of Ana Brnabić in 2020.

List of ministers
Political Party:

External links
Serbian ministries, etc – Rulers.org

Defunct government ministries of Serbia
2008 establishments in Serbia
Ministries established in 2008
2011 disestablishments in Serbia
Ministries disestablished in 2011
Serbia